Scott Douglas Ourth (born February 7, 1959) was the Iowa State Representative from the 26th District.  A Democrat, he served in the Iowa House of Representatives from 2013 to 2021. Ourth lives in Indianola, Iowa. He attended Central Michigan University and graduated from Graceland College.

Scott is a past vice-president of the Disability Rights Iowa Board of Directors and has served on the Graceland University Alumni Board of Directors. He has received the American Cancer Society Distinguished Service Award and the American Heart Association Director's Award. He has served on the Warren County Leadership Institute Board of Directors and is a member of the Indianola Noon Lion's Club.

, Ourth served on several committees in the Iowa House – the Agriculture, Economic Growth, and Natural Resources committees.  He also served as a member of the Agriculture and Natural Resources Appropriations Subcommittee.

Scott Ourth lives in Indianola, Iowa. He is an active member of the Community of Christ Church and is an accomplished outdoorsman.

Electoral history

*Denotes incumbent

References

External links

 Representative Scott Ourth official Iowa General Assembly site
 
 Financial information (state office) at the National Institute for Money in State Politics

Place of birth missing (living people)
Central Michigan University alumni
Graceland University alumni
Democratic Party members of the Iowa House of Representatives
Living people
People from Warren County, Iowa
American members of the Community of Christ
1959 births
21st-century American politicians